The Underwater Welder is a Canadian  graphic novel ghost story published by Top Shelf Productions written and drawn by Jeff Lemire. The main character, Jack Joseph, is an offshore oil rig worker responsible for scuba-diving and repairing the rig. On shore, his wife is pregnant with their unborn son and Jack feels the pressure of impending fatherhood. On one dive, Jack encounters a supernatural presence at the bottom of the sea that puts him in contact with the ghost of his own father. The story explores themes dealing with the relationship between father and sons and memory and reality.

Critical reception

Various critical websites hailed The Underwater Welder as one of the best graphic novels of 2012. Comic Book Resources, The A.V. Club, and ComicsAlliance listed the graphic novel in their "Best of 2012" lists.

Film adaptation
In March 2017, Anonymous Content and Ryan Gosling announced that they will produce the film based on the graphic novel.

References

2012 graphic novels
Canadian graphic novels
Underwater novels
Comics by Jeff Lemire